Ajitnagar is a village located in the Araria district of the state of Bihar in India. According to the 2011 Indian census, the village has a total population of 957. The literacy rate at the village is relatively high and stand at 70.92%. The village is led by an elected Sarpanch.

References

Cities and towns in Araria district